Tom Rolfe (April 14, 1962 – June 12, 1989) was an American Thoroughbred racehorse  and sire. He was the leading colt of his generation in the United States, winning the Preakness Stakes and being voted American Champion Three-Year-Old Male Horse in 1965.

Background
Tom Rolfe was one of the best American sons of the undefeated Italian champion Ribot. His dam was Pocahontas, from whom he takes his name (the historical Pocahontas's only child was named Thomas). His half-siblings include the talented racehorse and sire Chieftain (a son of Bold Ruler).

A small horse, Tom Rolfe stood  15.2 hands and weighed less than 1,000 pounds.

Racing career
Tom Rolfe won 16 of his 31 starts, with total earnings of $671,297. Ridden by future Hall of Fame jockey Ron Turcotte, he ran third to winner Lucky Debonair in the 1965 Kentucky Derby. In May he won the Preakness Stakes at Pimlico Race Course, beating Dapper Dan by a neck, despite losing a shoe in the race and sustaining a minor injury. In the Belmont Stakes in June he led in the straight but was caught close to the finish and beaten a neck by Hail To All. He went on to record a notable hat-trick at Arlington Park, winning the Citation Handicap in July, the Arlington Classic in August, and the American Derby in September (breaking the track record). His performances were enough to earn him American Champion 3-Year-Old Male Horse honors.

His sire, Ribot, won back-to-back runnings of the Prix de l'Arc de Triomphe, and Tom Rolfe was shipped to Longchamp Racecourse in Paris, France to contest the 1965 Arc. He disputed the lead until the closing stages and finished sixth on the grass course to Sea-Bird, but that result remains one of the best by an American-trained entry in that championship race.

Tom Rolfe stayed in training as a four-year-old in 1966. His wins included carrying 127 pounds to victory in the Aqueduct Handicap in September.

Stud record
Retired to stud at Claiborne Farm near Paris, Kentucky, Tom Rolfe proved a successful sire. He is largely known today as a sire of outstanding broodmares, but his best offspring on the track was 1970 American Champion Two-Year-Old Colt and 1987 leading broodmare sire Hoist The Flag. Tom Rolfe died in 1989 and was buried at Claiborne Farm's Marchmont cemetery.

Breeding

References

Tom Rolfe's pedigree and stats

1962 racehorse births
1989 racehorse deaths
Racehorses bred in Kentucky
Racehorses trained in the United States
Horse racing track record setters
Preakness Stakes winners
United States Champion Thoroughbred Sires
Eclipse Award winners
Thoroughbred family 9-h
Chefs-de-Race